South Fermanagh was a constituency of the Parliament of Northern Ireland.

Boundaries
Fermanagh South was a county constituency comprising the southern part of County Fermanagh. It was created in 1929 when the House of Commons (Method of Voting and Redistribution of Seats) Act (Northern Ireland) 1929 introduced first-past-the-post elections throughout Northern Ireland. Fermanagh South was created by the division of Fermanagh and Tyrone into eight new constituencies, of which three were in County Fermanagh. The constituency survived unchanged, returning one member of Parliament until the Parliament of Northern Ireland was temporarily suspended in 1972, and then formally abolished in 1973.

Politics
Unlike the other seats in County Fermanagh, South Fermanagh was a strongly nationalist area. The seat was consistently won by the Nationalist Party candidate, who, for most of its existence, was the party leader, Cahir Healy. It was only contested on two occasions: in 1949 by an Ulster Unionist Party candidate, and in 1969 by a People's Democracy candidate.

Members of Parliament

Election results

At the 1929, 1933, 1938 and 1945 general elections, Cahir Healy was elected unopposed.

At the 1953, 1958 and 1962 general elections, Cahir Healy was elected unopposed.

At the 1965 Northern Ireland general election, John Carron was elected unopposed.

 Parliament prorogued 30 March 1972 and abolished 18 July 1973

References

Northern Ireland Parliament constituencies established in 1929
Constituencies of the Northern Ireland Parliament
Historic constituencies in County Fermanagh
Northern Ireland Parliament constituencies disestablished in 1973